Jingming Garden is an imperial garden on the Jade Spring Hill in Beijing, China, west of the Summer Palace. It is one of Major Historical and Cultural Site Protected at the National Level.

History
Jingming Garden was first built in the Jurchen Jin dynasty and also called Lotus Palace (Furong Palace) and Jade Spring Pavilion.

Yanhua Temple was built in Zhengde era of Ming dynasty.

The Clean Heart Garden was built in the 19th year of the Kangxi reign of the Qing dynasty and renamed as Jingming Garden in the 31st year of Kangxi.

It was burn down by Anglo-French Allied Force and Eight-Nation Alliance in 1860 and 1900 respectively.
It became Jade Spring Hill Water Company after the Revolution of 1911 and was opened to the public.

After the People’s Republic of China was founded, Jingming Garden was the summer retreat of national leaders and was renovated. The plan to arrest the Gang of Four was formulated here.

Jingming Garden is a Beijing cultural relics protection unit. It was listed in the 6th batch of Major Historical and Cultural Site Protected at the National Level by the State Council on 25 May 2006.

Features
Jade Spring was named to be "the best spring in the world" by Qianlong. Spouting Jade Spring is one of Eight scenery of Peking.
Jade Hill Tower is in the main peak of Jade Spring Hill. It is an octagonal seven steps wood-like stone tower with height 47.7 meter, which well known by one of sixty scenery”Jade Hill Tower Shadow”.
Huazang Tower is an octagonal seven steps dense eaves type white marble stone tower.
Chengzhao Pass was crenelation connected with the height beyond 6 meter.
Lanka Cave is a cave with esoteric buddhism bas-reliefs on precipices with high artistic value.

Gardens in Beijing
Haidian District